Battisborough Cross is a village in the parish of Holbeton near Plymouth on the south coast of Devon, England . 
It is within the South Devon Area of Outstanding Natural Beauty

Villages in Devon